This is a list of butterflies of Samoa and American Samoa.

Hesperiidae

Coeliadinae
Badamia exclamationis (Fabricius, 1775)

Hesperiinae
Oriens augustula alexina (Plötz, 1884)

Papilionidae

Papilioninae
Papilio godeffroyi Semper, 1866

Pieridae

Coliadinae
Eurema hecabe sulphurata (Butler, 1875)
Belenois java schmeltzi Hopkins, 1927

Lycaenidae

Theclinae
Deudorix epijarbas doris Hopkins, 1927

Polyommatinae
Nacaduba dyopa dyopa (Herrich-Schaeffer, 1869)
Jamides argentina (von Prittwitz, 1867)
Catochrysops taitensis pepe (Hopkins, 1927)
Famegana alsulus lulu (Mathew, 1889)
Zizina labradus mangoensis (Butler, 1884)
Zizula hylax dampierensis (Rothschild, 1915)
Euchrysops cnejus samoa (Herrich-Schaeffer, 1869)

Nymphalidae

Danainae
Tirumala hamata melittula (Herrich-Schaeffer, 1869)
Tirumala hamata tutuilae (Hopkins, 1927)
Danaus plexippus plexippus (Linnaeus, 1758)
Euploea algea schmeltzi (Herrich-Schaeffer, 1869)
Euploea lewinii bourkei (Poulton, 1924)

Satyrinae
Melanitis leda hopkinsi Poulton & Riley, 1928

Nymphalinae
Doleschallia tongana vomana (Fruhstorfer, 1902)
Hypolimnas antilope lutescens (Butler, 1874)
Hypolimnas errabunda Hopkins, 1927
Hypolimnas octocula octocula (Butler, 1869)
Hypolimnas bolina pallescens (Butler, 1874)
Junonia villida villida (Fabricius, 1787)

Heliconiinae
Vagrans egista bowdenia (M. R. Butler, 1874)
Phalanta exulans (Hopkins, 1927)

Acraeinae
Acraea andromacha polynesiaca Rebel, 1910

References
W.John Tennent: A checklist of the butterflies of Melanesia, Micronesia, Polynesia and some adjacent areas. Zootaxa 1178: 1-209 (21 Apr. 2006)

Samoa
Samoa
Butterflies
Samoa
Samoa